was a professional wrestling event promoted by World Wonder Ring Stardom. The event took place on February 4, 2023 in Osaka, Aichi at the Osaka Prefectural Gymnasium. This was the second event in the Supreme Fight chronology.

Professional wrestling events have been held with a limited attendance since the beginning of the COVID-19 pandemic in Japan. However, on January 30, 2023, the Japanese government voted to lift crowd size limits and mandatory masks for attendees. The event was the first pay-per-view hosted by Stardom with full spectator capacity during the pandemic.

Production

Background
The show featured seven professional wrestling matches that result from scripted storylines, where wrestlers portrayed villains, heroes, or less distinguishable characters in the scripted events that built tension and culminated in a wrestling match or series of matches. The event's press conference where the matches were officially announced took place on January 11, 2023, and was broadcast on Stardom's YouTube channel.

Event
The preshow roulette match was broadcast on Stardom's YouTube channel. Since the main prize was competing for the title of her choice, the winner Saki Kashima chose the High Speed Championship. The first match of the main card saw Classmates (Hazuki, Saya Iida and Koguma) picking a victory over Unique Glare (Starlight Kid, Karma and Ruaka) in a Triangle Derby group stage match. Next, Syuri, Ami Sourei and a returning Konami defeated Utami Hayashishita, AZM and Lady C. The fourth match portraited the singles competition between Mirai and Sendai Girls' Pro Wrestling Chihiro Hashimoto. Holding a grudge against Syuri since a couple of years, Hashimoto invaded Stardom weeks before the event and challenged the God's Eye's leader to a fight, challenge responded by Mirai instead. The bout concluded with the victory of Hashimoto. Next up, 7Upp (Nanae Takahashi and Yuu) defeated MaiHime (Maika and Himeka) to secure their first defense of the Goddess of Stardom Championship. After the match, they received a challenge from BMI 2000 (Ruaka and Natsuko Tora). In the semi main event, Saya Kamitani defeated Momo Watanabe to secure the fourteenth consecutive defense of the Wonder of Stardom Championship, establishing a new record at the time, previously held by Watanabe herself with thirteen defenses.

In the main event, Giulia defeated one third of the Artist of Stardom Champions Suzu Suzuki to successfully retain the World of Stardom Championship for the first time in that respective reign. Both Giulia and Suzuki continued their feud based on Giulia's departure from Ice Ribbon.

Results

Naniwa roulette match

Notes

References

External links
Page Stardom World

2023 in professional wrestling
Professional wrestling in Osaka
World Wonder Ring Stardom shows
Women's professional wrestling shows
World Wonder Ring Stardom